Sivella is a genus of air-breathing land snails, terrestrial pulmonate gastropod mollusks in the subfamily Durgellinae of the family Helicarionidae.

Species
 Sivella albofilosa (Bavay & Dautzenberg, 1909)
 Sivella bagoensis (Hidalgo, 1890)
 Sivella billeana (Mörch, 1872)
 Sivella bintuanensis (Hidalgo, 1890)
 Sivella castra (Benson, 1852)
 Sivella cerea (Möllendorff, 1898)
 Sivella costellifera (Möllendorff, 1890)
 Sivella crossei (Hidalgo, 1890)
 Sivella decipiens (Quadras & Möllendorff, 1898)
 Sivella galerus (Benson, 1856)
 Sivella granulosa (Möllendorff, 1888)
 Sivella heptogyra (Quadras & Möllendorff, 1894)
 Sivella hyptiocyclos (Benson, 1863)
 Sivella latior (Bavay & Dautzenberg, 1909)
 Sivella loocensis (Hidalgo, 1887)
 Sivella luteobrunnea (Möllendorff, 1890)
 Sivella mindoroana (Quadras & Möllendorff, 1895)
 Sivella montana (Möllendorff, 1901)
 Sivella platysma (Quadras & Möllendorff, 1896)
 Sivella pseudosericina (Möllendorff, 1898)
 Sivella rufa (Möllendorff, 1888)
 Sivella sericata (Möllendorff, 1898)
 Sivella sericina (Möllendorff, 1893)
 Sivella splendens (C. Semper, 1873)
 Sivella splendidula (Möllendorff, 1890)
 Sivella subtaeniata (Quadras & Möllendorff, 1896)
 Sivella suturalis (Quadras & Möllendorff, 1894)
Synonym
 Sivella paviei (Morlet, 1885): synonuym of Trochomorpha paviei (Morlet, 1885)

References

 Bank, R. A. (2017). Classification of the Recent terrestrial Gastropoda of the World. Last update: July 16th, 2017

External links
 Blanford, W. T. (1863). On Indian species of land-shells belonging to the genera Helix, Linn., and Nanina, Gray. Annals and Magazine of Natural History. (3) 11(62): 81-86

Helicarionidae